M. V. Bobjee (11 November 1917 – 10 October 1981) was an Indian cricketer. He played first-class cricket for several domestic teams in India between 1941 and 1958.

See also
 List of Hyderabad cricketers

References

External links
 

1917 births
1981 deaths
Indian cricketers
Baroda cricketers
Hyderabad cricketers
Madhya Pradesh cricketers
Tamil Nadu cricketers
Cricketers from Chennai